Music for the Films of Buster Keaton: Go West is the sixth album by Bill Frisell to be released on the Elektra Nonesuch label. It was released in 1995 and features performances by Frisell, bassist Kermit Driscoll and drummer Joey Baron. The album is designed as accompaniment to the Buster Keaton's silent film classic, Go West (1925), and was released at the same time as another album of Keaton soundtracks by Frisell, The High Sign/One Week (1995).

Reception
The AllMusic review by JT Griffith stated:

Track listing
All compositions by Bill Frisell.
 "Down on Luck" – 4:11
 "Box Car" – 0:57
 "Busy Street Scene" – 0:44
 "Go West" – 1:00
 "Train" – 3:06
 "Brown Eyes" – 4:21
 "Saddle Up!" – 2:41
 "First Aid" – 0:51
 "Bullfight" – 2:25
 "Wolves" – 3:14
 "New Day" – 5:27
 "Branded" – 1:20
 "Eats" – 1:13
 "Splinter Scene" – 2:33
 "Cattle Drive" – 4:36
 "Card Game" – 5:03
 "Ambush" – 4:02
 "Passing Through Pasadena" – 1:52
 "To The Streets" – 3:11
 "Tap Dancer and Confusion" – 6:42
 "Devil Suit" – 2:08
 "Cops and Fireman" – 3:58
 "That a Boy" – 1:31
 "I Want Her" – 2:13

Personnel
Bill Frisell – acoustic and electric guitars
Kermit Driscoll – acoustic and electric basses
Joey Baron – drums and percussion

References 

1995 albums
Bill Frisell albums
Nonesuch Records albums
Cultural depictions of Buster Keaton